Jagged Edge is a 1985 American neo-noir legal thriller written by Joe Eszterhas and directed by Richard Marquand which also marked the last film released in his lifetime. The film stars Glenn Close, Jeff Bridges, Peter Coyote and Robert Loggia. A lawyer reluctantly takes the case of a man accused of killing his wife, but remains uncertain if he is guilty or not.

The film received positive reviews from critics and was a box office success. Loggia was nominated for the Academy Award for Best Supporting Actor for his performance.

Plot 
A masked intruder breaks into the beach house of San Francisco socialite Paige Forrester, ties her to her bed, rips open her shirt, and kills her with a hunting knife. Her husband Jack, arrested for her murder, tries to hire high-profile lawyer Teddy Barnes to defend him. Barnes is reluctant to take the case since an incident with district attorney Thomas Krasny, her former boss, caused her to quit practicing criminal law.

Krasny tells Barnes that prisoner Henry Styles hanged himself, which distresses her. Barnes visits Sam Ransom, a private detective who also used to work for Krasny and who changed careers at the same time as Barnes. Barnes decides to take the case.

Barnes and Forrester prepare for the trial and eventually sleep together. Ransom warns Barnes that Forrester is just trying to make her care more about his case. Her office begins receiving anonymous letters containing non-public case details and an analysis shows they were typed on a 1942 Corona typewriter.

In a pre-trial meeting, Barnes tells the judge that Krasny has a history of not meeting discovery obligations. The prosecution's case relies on circumstantial evidence and two of its key witnesses are discredited by Barnes.

Krasny calls Eileen Avery, who had an affair with Forrester, to testify. As Avery details her relationship with Forrester, Barnes finds it eerily similar to her own relationship with him. She feels manipulated and now believes Forrester is guilty but continues out of a sense of duty.

Another note arrives at her office saying, "He is innocent. Santa Cruz. January 21, 1984. Ask Julie Jensen." Barnes calls Jensen to testify that she was attacked in the same manner as Paige Forrester. All the details match, but she says her attacker seemed to stop himself from killing her. As Krasny objects that the attack on Jensen is unrelated to the one on Forrester, he lets slip that his office had investigated the attack and not revealed it in discovery. In chambers, the judge threatens to have Krasny disbarred. Krasny insists that Forrester planned Paige's murder for 18 months, he attacked Jensen to create an alibi for himself, and he is the writer of the anonymous letters.

The judge forbids Krasny from presenting his theory to the jury and Forrester is found not guilty. Barnes announces to the media that she left the district attorney's office when Krasny suppressed evidence that proved Henry Styles was innocent. Krasny walks off in disgust.

Barnes goes to Forrester's house to celebrate, and they sleep together again. In the morning, she discovers, in a closet, a 1942 Corona typewriter matching the analysis of the anonymous notes. She takes it and flees.

When Forrester calls, she tells him she found the typewriter. Forrester insists on coming over. Barnes calls Ransom, on the brink of telling him that Forrester is a killer, but instead hangs up. A masked figure breaks in and confronts her in her bedroom. As he starts to attack, Barnes throws back the covers to reveal a handgun. She shoots him several times until he falls to the floor. Ransom comes in and unmasks the attacker: Forrester.

Cast 

Maria Mayenzet briefly appears, in the opening scene, as murder victim Paige Forrester.

Production 
According to Joe Eszterhas, the film originated with producer Martin Ransohoff, who wanted to make a courtroom drama in the vein of Anatomy of a Murder. The film was originally written as a vehicle for Jane Fonda, who turned down the project. According to Eszterhas, Ransohoff was unimpressed with the casting of Glenn Close and tried to make her re-shoot a sex scene, so that he could watch her.<ref>Hollywood Animal, Alfred A. Knopf, 2004, </ref>

 Reception 
 Critical response 
On Rotten Tomatoes the film has an approval rating of 81% based on 31 reviews. The site's consensus states; "Coolly performed and suspenseful, Jagged Edge is a satisfying enough potboiler that most audiences won't mind if the twists don't quite add up." On Metacritic it has a score of 60% based on reviews from 15 critics, indicating "mixed or average reviews".Variety called it "a well-crafted, hardboiled mystery" and praised the performances of the two lead actors. Roger Ebert of the Chicago Sun-Times described the suspense in the film as "supremely effective" and rated the movie 3 1/2 stars. Pauline Kael of The New Yorker wrote: "This thriller doesn't offer the pleasures of style, but it does its job. It catches you in a vise - it's scary, and when it's over you feel a little shaken."

Janet Maslin of The New York Times praised the performances, but thought the film predictable. 
Rita Kempley of The Washington Post denounced the film, saying "Jagged Edge is not entertainment. It is commercially packaged abuse."

 Accolades 
Robert Loggia was nominated for the Academy Award for Best Supporting Actor for his performance.

 Abandoned sequel 

The film Physical Evidence was originally conceived as a sequel to Jagged Edge and was meant to have Glenn Close and Robert Loggia reprise their roles. The story was about a private investigator framed for murder and the female lawyer who defends him. The project was developed at Columbia Pictures but then head of production Guy McElwaine was replaced by David Puttnam, who, according to producer Martin Ransohoff, said that he did not want to make sequels (Puttnam denied this, saying his problem was the script "wasn't good and for no other reason... when there's a terrific script for Jagged Edge II Columbia will be anxious to make it".). Ransohoff decided to turn the script into an original story. "It's a good mystery on its own terms," he said. "I think the story is really more effective as an original. Because there wasn't an agreement with Loggia and Close, we had always designed the project to go either as a sequel or on its own terms."

 Remake 
It was remade into the Hindi film in India as Kasoor (2001).Sony Pictures announced in 2018 that a remake of Jagged Edge'' was in development with Halle Berry starring.

References

External links

 
 
 

1985 films
1980s legal films
1980s mystery thriller films
1980s erotic drama films
1980s psychological thriller films
American courtroom films
American erotic thriller films
American mystery thriller films
American psychological thriller films
Columbia Pictures films
American erotic drama films
Films about lawyers
Films about murder
Films directed by Richard Marquand
Films scored by John Barry (composer)
Films set in San Francisco
Legal thriller films
Films with screenplays by Joe Eszterhas
1985 drama films
1980s English-language films
1980s American films